Roman Plekhov (born 10 September 1997) is a Belarusian former professional footballer.

References

External links 
 
 

1997 births
Living people
Belarusian footballers
Association football midfielders
FC Energetik-BGU Minsk players
FC Smorgon players
FC Krumkachy Minsk players